Greta Alejandra Espinoza Casas (born 5 June 1995) is a Mexican footballer who plays as a defender for Mexican club Tigres UANL and the Mexico national team.

Honors and awards

Club
UANL
Liga MX Femenil: Clausura 2018
Liga MX Femenil: Clausura 2019
Liga MX Femenil: Guard1anes 2020
Liga MX Femenil: Guard1anes 2021

References

External links
 
 
 
 Fox Sports player profile
 Profile at Mexican Football Federation 
 

1995 births
Living people
Sportspeople from Tijuana
Mexican women's footballers
Footballers from Baja California
Mexican footballers
Arizona Western College alumni
Oregon State Beavers women's soccer players
Levante UD Femenino players
Primera División (women) players
Mexico women's international footballers
2015 FIFA Women's World Cup players
Footballers at the 2015 Pan American Games
Mexican expatriate women's footballers
Mexican expatriate sportspeople in the United States
Expatriate women's soccer players in the United States
Mexican expatriate sportspeople in Spain
Expatriate women's footballers in Spain
Women's association football defenders
Liga MX Femenil players
Tigres UANL (women) footballers
Pan American Games competitors for Mexico
Pan American Games bronze medalists for Mexico
Medalists at the 2015 Pan American Games
Pan American Games medalists in football